Médoune Gueye (born 28 March 1982) is a retired French footballer who played as a defender.

References

External links
 Profile at Soccerway

1982 births
Living people
Association football defenders
French footballers
Entente SSG players
IFK Mariehamn players
Veikkausliiga players
French expatriate footballers
Expatriate footballers in Finland
French expatriate sportspeople in Finland